Durai may refer to:

 Durai (director) (born 1940), Tamil film director
 Durai (film), a 2008 Tamil film directed by A. Venkatesh
 T. T. Durai (born 1948), former CEO of the National Kidney Foundation Singapore
 Durai (Shortfilm Director) (born 1989 April 15), Tamil Shortfilm Director

Tamil given names